The year 2004 is the sixth year in the history of King of the Cage, a mixed martial arts promotion based in the United States. In 2004 King of the Cage held 14 events, KOTC 32: Bringing Heat.

Title fights

Events list

KOTC 32: Bringing Heat

KOTC 32: Bringing Heat was an event held on January 24, 2004 in Miami, Florida, United States.

Results

KOTC 33: After Shock

KOTC 33: After Shock was an event held on February 20, 2004 at the Soboba Casino in San Jacinto, California, United States.

Results

KOTC 34: Ohio

KOTC 34: Ohio was an event held on February 28, 2004 at the Canton Memorial Civic Center in Canton, Ohio, United States.

Results

KOTC 35: Acoma

KOTC 35: Acoma was an event held on February 28, 2004 at the Sky City Casino in Acoma, New Mexico, United States.

Results

KOTC 36: Albuquerque

KOTC 36: Albuquerque was an event held on May 15, 2004 at the Sky City Casino in Albuquerque, New Mexico, United States.

Results

KOTC 37: Unfinished Business

KOTC 37: Unfinished Business was an event held on June 12, 2004 at the Soboba Casino in San Jacinto, California, United States.

Results

KOTC 39: Hitmaster

KOTC 39: Hitmaster was an event held on August 6, 2004 at the Soboba Casino in San Jacinto, California, United States.

Results

KOTC: New Mexico

KOTC: New Mexico was an event held on August 28, 2004 at the Sky City Casino in Albuquerque, New Mexico, United States.

Results

KOTC 41: Relentless

KOTC 41: Relentless was an event held on September 29, 2004 at the Soboba Casino in San Jacinto, California, United States.

Results

KOTC 42: Buckeye Nuts

KOTC 42: Buckeye Nuts was an event held on October 23, 2004 at the Hara Arena in Dayton, Ohio, United States.

Results

KOTC: Sunland Park

KOTC: Sunland Park was an event held on October 29, 2004 at the Sunland Park Racetrack & Casino in Sunland Park, New Mexico, United States.

Results

KOTC 44: Revenge

KOTC 44: Revenge was an event held on November 14, 2004 at the Soboba Casino in San Jacinto, California, United States.

Results

KOTC 45: King of the Cage 45

KOTC 45: King of the Cage 45 was an event held on November 20, 2004 at the Belterra Casino Resort & Spa in Belterra, Indiana, United States.

Results

KOTC: Hostile Takeover

KOTC: Hostile Takeover was an event held on December 4, 2004 at the Sky City Casino in Acoma, New Mexico, United States.

Results

See also 
 King of the Cage
 List of King of the Cage events
 List of King of the Cage champions

References

King of the Cage events
2004 in mixed martial arts